Robert Ferguson House was a historic home located near Newark, New Castle County, Delaware.  The original was built between 1790 and 1810, and formed a two-story, two-bay, single pile frame section. A lower, two-story one-room section was added about 1835 and a one-story, two-bay section was added about 1900.  Also on the property was a contributing shed.

It was added to the National Register of Historic Places in 1979. The buildings were demolished during the widening of Delaware Route 4 in the early 1980s.

References

External links

Houses on the National Register of Historic Places in Delaware
Houses completed in 1800
Houses in Newark, Delaware
Historic American Buildings Survey in Delaware
National Register of Historic Places in New Castle County, Delaware